Cryptocephalus binominis is a species of case-bearing leaf beetle in the family Chrysomelidae. It is found in North America.

Subspecies
These two subspecies belong to the species Cryptocephalus binominis:
 Cryptocephalus binominis binominis Newman, 1841
 Cryptocephalus binominis rufibasis Schaeffer, 1933

References

Further reading

 
 
 

binominis
Articles created by Qbugbot
Beetles described in 1841